COVID-19 pandemic in Korea may refer to:

COVID-19 pandemic in North Korea
COVID-19 pandemic in South Korea